Poroti is a locality in Northland, New Zealand. Titoki is about 7 km to the west, and Maungatapere is about 8 km east.

Around Poroti are a large number of orchards growing avocado, and a number of flower growing operations growing Sandersonia, calla lilies, orchids, and hydrangeas for export markets all over the world.

Education
Poroti School is a coeducational full primary (years 1–8) school with a decile rating of 6 and a roll of 37. The school held a 125-year reunion in 2004.

Notes

Whangarei District
Populated places in the Northland Region